Gustavo Dalto  (born 16 March 1963) is a former Uruguayan footballer and football manager.

Career
Dalto played for Talleres de Córdoba in the Primera División de Argentina. Dalto made 12 appearances for the senior Uruguay national football team from 1985 to 1989.

References

 

1963 births
Living people
People from Pando, Uruguay
Uruguayan footballers
Uruguay international footballers
1987 Copa América players
Danubio F.C. players
Peñarol players
Racing Club de Montevideo players
Xerez CD footballers
Talleres de Córdoba footballers
Independiente Santa Fe footballers
Once Caldas footballers
Argentine Primera División players
Categoría Primera A players
Uruguayan football managers
Danubio F.C. managers
Uruguayan expatriate footballers
Expatriate footballers in Argentina
Copa América-winning players
Association football midfielders